Aurantimonas aggregata is a Gram-negative, short-rod-shaped and aerobic bacteria from the genus of Aurantimonas which has been isolated from deep-sea sediments from the Ross Sea in the Antarctica.

References

External links
Type strain of Aurantimonas aggregata at BacDive -  the Bacterial Diversity Metadatabase

Hyphomicrobiales
Bacteria described in 2017